Lasserre is a commune in the Ariège department in southwestern France.

It was the home of Alexander Grothendieck for over ten years until his death.

Population

See also
Communes of the Ariège department

References

Communes of Ariège (department)
Ariège communes articles needing translation from French Wikipedia